Sven Andersson (born 18 April 1945) is a Swedish football defender who mostly played for IF Elfsborg and was capped three times for Sweden.

References

1945 births
Living people
Swedish footballers
IF Elfsborg players
Norrby IF players
Sweden international footballers
IF Elfsborg managers
Association football defenders
Swedish football managers